The 2012 UCF Knights baseball team represented the University of Central Florida in the 2012 NCAA Division I baseball season. The Knights played their home games at Jay Bergman Field in Orlando, Florida. The Knights were led by head coach Terry Rooney, who was in his fourth season with the team.

The 2012 season marked the second consecutive season that the Knights made the NCAA Tournament. Their 2011 tournament appearance was the program's first since 2004.

Personnel

Coaching Staff

Roster

Schedule

! style="background:#000000;color:#BC9B6A;"| Regular Season
|- valign="top" 

|- bgcolor="#ddffdd"
| February 17 ||  || – || Jay Bergman Field || 13–7 || 1–0 || –
|- bgcolor="#ddffdd"
| February 18 || Long Island || – || Jay Bergman Field || 9–1 || 2–0 || –
|- bgcolor="#ddffdd"
| February 18 || Long Island || – || Jay Bergman Field || 9–1 || 3–0 || –
|- bgcolor="#ffdddd"
| February 22 || at #1 Florida || – || McKethan Stadium|| 0–8 || 3–1 || –
|- bgcolor="#ddffdd"
| February 24 ||  || – || Jay Bergman Field || 6–5 || 4–1 || –
|- bgcolor="#ffdddd"
| February 25 || Boston College || – || Jay Bergman Field || 7–8 || 4–2 || –
|- bgcolor="#ddffdd"
| February 26 || Boston College || – || Jay Bergman Field || 5–4 || 5–2 || –
|- bgcolor="#ddffdd"
| February 28 ||  || – || Jay Bergman Field || 12–1 || 6–2 || –
|- bgcolor="#ddffdd"
| February 29 || at Bethune-Cookman || – || Jackie Robinson Ballpark || 8–4 || 7–2 || –
|-

|- bgcolor="#ddffdd"
| March 2 || Siena || – || Jay Bergman Field || 12–4 || 8–2 || –
|- bgcolor="#ddffdd"
| March 3 || Siena || – || Jay Bergman Field || 16–4 || 9–2 || –
|- bgcolor="#ddffdd"
| March 4 || Siena || – || Jay Bergman Field || 15–2 || 10–2 || –
|- bgcolor="#ffdddd"
| March 6 || #8 Florida State || #24 || Jay Bergman Field || 6–7 || 10–3 || –
|- bgcolor="#ffdddd"
| March 7 || #8 Florida State || #24 || Jay Bergman Field || 0–1 || 10–4 || –
|- bgcolor="#ddffdd"
| March 9 ||  || #24 || Jay Bergman Field || 16–4 || 11–4 || –
|- bgcolor="#ddffdd"
| March 10 || UMass || #24 || Jay Bergman Field || 5–4 || 12–4 || –
|- bgcolor="#ddffdd"
| March 11 || UMass || #24 || Jay Bergman Field || 2–1 || 13–4 || –
|- bgcolor="#ffdddd"
| March 14 || #10  || #23 || Jay Bergman Field || 2–3 || 13–5 || –
|- bgcolor="#ddffdd"
| March 16 ||  || #23 || Jay Bergman Field || 4–3 || 14–5 || –
|- bgcolor="#ddffdd"
| March 17 || Harvard || #23 || Jay Bergman Field || 4–2 || 15–5 || –
|- bgcolor="#ddffdd"
| March 18 || Harvard || #23 || Jay Bergman Field || 6–5 || 16–5 || –
|- bgcolor="#ddffdd"
| March 20 || at  || #21 || USF Baseball Stadium || 6–2 || 17–5 || –
|- bgcolor="#ddffdd"
| March 23 ||  || #21 || Jay Bergman Field || 2–1 || 18–5 || 1–0
|- bgcolor="#ddffdd"
| March 24 || East Carolina || #21 || Jay Bergman Field || 10–6 || 19–5 || 2–0
|- bgcolor="#ffdddd"
| March 25 || East Carolina || #21 || Jay Bergman Field || 6–15 || 19–6 || 2–1
|- bgcolor="#ddffdd"
| March 27 || at  || #17 || FAU Baseball Stadium || 11–3 || 20–6 || –
|- bgcolor="#ddffdd"
| March 30 || at  || #17 || Cougar Field || 8–3 || 21–6 || 3–1
|- bgcolor="#ddffdd"
| March 31 || at Houston || #17 || Cougar Field || 9–1 || 22–6 || 4–1
|-

|- bgcolor="#ddffdd"
| April 1 || at  || #17 || Cougar Field || 3–110 || 23–6 || 5–1
|- bgcolor="#ddffdd"
| April 4 || at #13  || #14 || Alex Rodriguez Park || 4–1 || 24–6 || –
|- bgcolor="#ffdddd"
| April 6 ||  || #14 || Jay Bergman Field || 4–11 || 24–7 || 5–2
|- bgcolor="#ddffdd"
| April 7 || UAB || #14 || Jay Bergman Field || 7–3 || 25–7 || 6–2
|- bgcolor="#ddffdd"
| April 8 || UAB || #14 || Jay Bergman Field || 8–7 || 26–7 || 7–2
|- bgcolor="#ddffdd"
| April 10 ||  || #15 || Jay Bergman Field || 16–4 || 27–7 || –
|- bgcolor="#ddffdd"
| April 11 || Bethune-Cookman || #15 || Jay Bergman Field || 6–2 || 28–7 || –
|- bgcolor="#ffdddd"
| April 13 || at  || #15 || Pete Taylor Park || 0–114 || 28–8 || 7–3
|- bgcolor="#ddffdd"
| April 14 || at Southern Miss || #15 || Pete Taylor Park || 11–6 || 29–8 || 8–3
|- bgcolor="#ddffdd"
| April 15 || at Southern Miss || #15 || Pete Taylor Park || 12–3 || 30–8 || 9–3
|- bgcolor="#ddffdd"
| April 17 ||  || #14 || Jay Bergman Field || 12–3 || 31–8 || –
|- bgcolor="#ddffdd"
| April 20 || at  || #14 || Greer Field at Turchin Stadium || 1–0 || 32–8 || 10–3
|- bgcolor="#ddffdd"
| April 21 || at Tulane || #14 || Greer Field at Turchin Stadium || 8–712 || 33–8 || 11–3
|- bgcolor="#ddffdd"
| April 22 || at Tulane || #14 || Greer Field at Turchin Stadium || 8–6 || 34–8 || 12–3
|- bgcolor="#ddffdd"
| April 27 || at  || #7 || FedExPark || 4–3 || 35–8 || 13–3
|- bgcolor="#ffdddd"
| April 28 || at Memphis || #7 || FedExPark || 5–6 || 35–9 || 13–4
|- bgcolor="#ffdddd"
| April 29 || at Memphis || #7 || FedExPark || 0–1 || 35–10 || 13–5
|-

|- bgcolor="#ddffdd"
| May 2 || at  || #15 || Melching Field || 5–413 || 36–10 || –
|- bgcolor="#ddffdd"
| May 5 ||  || #15 || Jay Bergman Field || 8–1 || 37–10 || –
|- bgcolor="#ffdddd"
| May 6 || Presbyterian || #15 || Jay Bergman Field || 2–7 || 37–11 || –
|- bgcolor="#ddffdd"
| May 7 || Presbyterian  || #15 || Jay Bergman Field || 7–2 || 38–11 || –
|- bgcolor="#ddffdd"
| May 11 || at  || #16 || Appalachian Power Park || 8–6 || 39–11 || 14–5
|- bgcolor="#ffdddd"
| May 12 || at Marshall || #16 || Appalachian Power Park || 6–9 || 39–12 || 14–6
|- bgcolor="#ddffdd"
| May 13 || at Marshall || #16 || Appalachian Power Park || 13–6 || 40–12 || 15–6
|- bgcolor="#F0E8E8"
| May 15 || Stetson || #16 || Jay Bergman Field || colspan=3 | Cancelled (rain); no make-up.
|- bgcolor="#ddffdd"
| May 18 || #7  || #16 || Jay Bergman Field || 8–6 || 41–12 || 16–6
|- bgcolor="#ffdddd"
| May 18 || #7 Rice || #16 || Jay Bergman Field || 2–9 || 41–13 || 16–7
|- bgcolor="#ffdddd"
| May 19 || #7 Rice || #16 || Jay Bergman Field || 2–5 || 41–14 || 16–8
|-

|-
! style="background:#000000;color:#BC9B6A;"| Post-Season
|-

|- bgcolor="#ffdddd"
| May 24 || vs. (7)  || #17 (2) || Trustmark Park || 1–157 || 41–15 || 0–1
|- bgcolor="#ddffdd"
| May 25 || vs. (6)  || #17 (2) || Trustmark Park || 11–18 || 42–15 || 1–1
|- bgcolor="#ddffdd"
| May 26 || vs. (3)  || #17 (2) || Trustmark Park || 6–2 || 43–15 || 2–1
|-

|- bgcolor="#ddffdd"
| June 1 || vs. (3)  || #18 (2) || Alex Rodriguez Park || 2–1 || 44–15 || 1–0
|- bgcolor="#ddffdd"
| June 2 || vs. (4) Stony Brook || #18 (2) || Alex Rodriguez Park || 9–8 || 45–15 || 2–0
|- bgcolor="#ffdddd"
| June 3 || vs. (4) Stony Brook || #18 (2) || Alex Rodriguez Park || 5–12 || 45–16 || 2–1
|- bgcolor="#ffdddd"
| June 4 || vs. (4) Stony Brook || #18 (2) || Alex Rodriguez Park || 6–10 || 45–17 || 2–2
|-

|-
| style="font-size:88%"| Rankings from USA TODAY/ESPN Top 25 coaches' baseball poll. All times Eastern. Parenthesis indicate tournament seedings.

Rankings

See also
UCF Knights
List of University of Central Florida alumni

References

UCF
UCF Knights baseball seasons
UCF Knights baseball
UCF